The 2011 WNBA season is the 4th season for the Atlanta Dream of the Women's National Basketball Association. The Dream finished the regular season with a 20-14 record, good for third-best in the Eastern Conference. The Dream then won their second consecutive Eastern Conference Championship. The Dream made their way to the WNBA Finals before being swept by the Minnesota Lynx.

Transactions

WNBA Draft

Trades and Roster Changes

Roster
{| class="toccolours" style="font-size: 95%; width: 100%;"
|-
! colspan="2" style="background:#6495ED;color:white;"|2011 Atlanta Dream Roster
|- style="text-align:center; background-color:#FF0000; color:#FFFFFF;"
! Players !! Coaches
|- 
| valign="top" |
{| class="sortable" style="background:transparent; margin:0px; width:100%;"
! Pos. !! # !! Nat. !! Name !! Ht. !! Wt. !! From
|-

Depth

Schedule

Preseason

|- align="center" bgcolor="bbffbb"
| 1 || May 29 || 12:00pm || @ Great Britain || NBATV || 82–51 || Miller (21) || Irvin (8) || Harding (5) || Manchester Evening News Arena  N/A || 1–0
|-

Regular season

|- align="center" bgcolor="ffbbbb"
| 1 || June 5 || 3:00pm || New York || SSO || 88–94 (OT) || Castro Marques (19) || Lyttle (11) || Harding (9) || Philips Arena  8,038 || 0–1
|- align="center" bgcolor="ffbbbb"
| 2 || June 9 || 7:00pm || Washington || ESPN2 || 90–98 (OT) || de Souza (20) || de Souza (15) || Castro Marques (5) || Philips Arena  5,020 || 0–2
|- align="center" bgcolor="ffbbbb"
| 3 || June 11 || 8:00pm || @ San Antonio ||  || 74–86 || McCoughtry (19) || de Souza (14) || Harding (4) || AT&T Center  9,140 || 0–3
|- align="center" bgcolor="bbffbb"
| 4 || June 14 || 7:00pm || @ New York ||  || 79–58 || McCoughtry (18) || BalesIrvin (7) || Lehning (6) || Prudential Center  5,725 || 1–3
|- align="center" bgcolor="ffbbbb"
| 5 || June 17 || 8:00pm || @ Minnesota ||  || 85–96 || McCoughtry (27) || de Souza (11) || Castro Marques (4) || Target Center  7,556 || 1–4 
|- align="center" bgcolor="ffbbbb"
| 6 || June 19 || 3:00pm || Minnesota || SSO || 64–77 || Harding (14) || de Souza (12) || HardingMiller (3) || Philips Arena  7,274 || 1–5 
|- align="center" bgcolor="bbffbb"
| 7 || June 21 || 12:00pm || Chicago || SSO || 71–68 || McCoughtry (14) || McCoughtryParis (8) || Harding (6) || Philips Arena  6,154 || 2–5
|- align="center" bgcolor="ffbbbb"
| 8 || June 24 || 7:30pm || Phoenix || FS-SFS-A || 83–92 || McCoughtry (24) || Paris (8) || Harding (4) || Philips Arena  5,492 || 2–6 
|- align="center" bgcolor="ffbbbb"
| 9 || June 26 || 3:00pm || San Antonio || NBATVSSO || 86–92 || Miller (19) || Paris (11) || Price (5) || Philips Arena  5,718 || 2–7 
|- align="center" bgcolor="bbffbb"
| 10 || June 30 || 7:30pm || New York || SSO || 87–81 || de Souza (27) || de Souza (15) || McCoughtryMiller (4) || Philips Arena  4,423 || 3–7 
|-

|- align="center" bgcolor="ffbbbb"
| 11 || July 9 || 8:00pm || @ Chicago || CN100 || 69–81 || McCoughtry (17) || McCoughtry (8) || McCoughtry (6) || Allstate Arena  5,679 || 3–8 
|- align="center" bgcolor="ffbbbb"
| 12 || July 13 || 12:00pm || @ New York ||  || 69–91 || McCoughtry (17) || de Souza (7) || Lehning (3) || Prudential Center  14,314 || 3–9 
|- align="center" bgcolor="bbffbb"
| 13 || July 16 || 7:30pm || Chicago || NBATVFS-SCN100 || 76–68 || McCoughtry (24) || Balesde Souza (8) || Price (10) || Philips Arena  7,413 || 4–9
|- align="center" bgcolor="bbffbb"
| 14 || July 19 || 12:00pm || Indiana || NBATVSSO || 84–74 || Harding (19) || de Souza (11) || Harding (5) || Philips Arena  7,645 || 5–9 
|- align="center" bgcolor="bbffbb"
| 15 || July 20 || 11:30am || @ Washington || NBATV || 86–79 || McCoughtry (33) || Irvin (11) || McCoughtryPrice (3) || Verizon Center  13,954 || 6–9 
|-
| colspan="11" align="center" valign="middle" | All-Star break
|- align="center" bgcolor="bbffbb"
| 16 || July 26 || 8:00pm || @ Tulsa ||  || 76–68 || McCoughtry (37) || Bales (9) || HardingLehning (3) || BOK Center  3,435 || 7–9 
|- align="center" bgcolor="bbffbb"
| 17 || July 28 || 7:00pm || Los Angeles || NBATVSSO || 89–80 || McCoughtry (22) || McCoughtry (11) || McCoughtry (7) || Philips Arena  6,701 || 8–9 
|- align="center" bgcolor="ffbbbb"
| 18 || July 31 || 5:00pm || @ Connecticut ||  || 92–99 || McCoughtry (36) || de Souza (9) || Castro Marques (6) || Mohegan Sun Arena  6,955 || 8–10 
|-

|- align="center" bgcolor="ffbbbb"
| 19 || August 2 || 7:30pm || New York || FS-S || 75–85 || McCoughtry (24) || McCoughtryPrice (6) || Harding (9) || Philips Arena  4,573 || 8–11 
|- align="center" bgcolor="bbffbb"
| 20 || August 7 || 3:00pm || Seattle || NBATVSSO || 70–53 || McCoughtry (17) || de SouzaLyttle (7) || Harding (7) || Philips Arena  7,337 || 9–11 
|- align="center" bgcolor="bbffbb"
| 21 || August 9 || 7:00pm || @ Washington || CSN-MA || 72–70 || McCoughtry (19) || de Souza (12) || McCoughtry (5) || Verizon Center  9,536 || 10–11
|- align="center" bgcolor="ffbbbb"
| 22 || August 11 || 10:00pm || @ Phoenix ||  || 95–109 || McCoughtry (25) || de Souza (7) || Bales (4) || US Airways Center  7,940 || 10–12 
|- align="center" bgcolor="bbffbb"
| 23 || August 13 || 10:00pm || @ Seattle || NBATVKONG || 92–63 || Castro MarquesMcCoughtry (17) || McCoughtry (6) || Price (4) || KeyArena  9,686 || 11–12 
|- align="center" bgcolor="bbffbb"
| 24 || August 16 || 10:30pm || @ Los Angeles || NBATVSSOPRIME || 84–79 || McCoughtry (23) || de Souza (13) || Price (8) || STAPLES Center  7,522 || 12–12 
|- align="center" bgcolor="bbffbb"
| 25 || August 19 || 7:30pm || Connecticut || NBATVSSO || 94–88 (OT) || McCoughtry (26) || McCoughtry (12) || Harding (5) || Philips Arena  7,225 || 13–12 
|- align="center" bgcolor="ffbbbb"
| 26 || August 21 || 5:00pm || @ Connecticut ||  || 87–96 || McCoughtry (22) || de Souza (10) || Harding (9) || Mohegan Sun Arena  6,636 || 13–13 
|- align="center" bgcolor="bbffbb"
| 27 || August 23 || 8:00pm || @ Chicago || CN100 || 83–80 || McCoughtry (22) || McCoughtry (7) || Harding (9) || Allstate Arena  2,876 || 14–13
|- align="center" bgcolor="bbffbb"
| 28 || August 27 || 7:00pm || @ Indiana || NBATVSSOFS-I || 86–80 || McCoughtry (20) || Lyttle (9) || Castro Marques (3) || Conseco Fieldhouse  9,242 || 15–13 
|- align="center" bgcolor="bbffbb"
| 29 || August 30 || 7:30pm || Indiana || SSO || 92–90 || McCoughtry (28) || Lyttle (11) || Harding (6) || Philips Arena  6,467 || 16–13 
|-

|- align="center" bgcolor="ffbbbb"
| 30 || September 1 || 7:00pm || @ Washington ||  || 81–85 || McCoughtry (30) || Irvin (7) || Harding (8) || Verizon Center  7,954 || 16–14 
|- align="center" bgcolor="bbffbb"
| 31 || September 2 || 7:30pm || Washington || NBATVSSO || 95–73 || Price (19) || Lyttle (8) || Harding (7) || Philips Arena  6,579 || 17–14 
|- align="center" bgcolor="bbffbb"
| 32 || September 4 || 3:00pm || Tulsa || SSO || 73–52 || McCoughtry (19) || BalesPrice (6) || Harding (10) || Philips Arena  7,661 || 18–14 
|- align="center" bgcolor="bbffbb"
| 33 || September 6 || 7:30pm || Connecticut || SSO || 85–74 || McCoughtry (35) || Lyttle (12) || Harding (8) || Philips Arena  6,558 || 19–14 
|- align="center" bgcolor="bbffbb"
| 34 || September 11 || 5:00pm || @ Indiana || NBATVSSOFS-I || 93–88 || McCoughtry (32) || Bales (11) || 4 players (4) || Conseco Fieldhouse  11,521 || 20–14 
|-

| All games are viewable on WNBA LiveAccess or ESPN3.com

Playoffs

|- align="center" bgcolor="bbffbb"
| 1 || September 16 || 7:00pm || @ Connecticut || NBATV || 89–84 || Harding (21) || Lyttle (11) || Price (5) || Mohegan Sun Arena  7,373 || 1–0 
|- align="center" bgcolor="bbffbb"
| 2 || September 18 || 3:00pm || Connecticut || ESPN2 || 69–64 || de SouzaHardingLyttleMcCoughtry (12) || de Souza (10) || Harding (6) || Philips Arena  6,887 || 2–0
|-

|- align="center" bgcolor="ffbbbb"
| 1 || September 22 || 7:00pm || @ Indiana || ESPN2 || 74–82 || Harding (17) || de Souza (13) || Harding (7) || Conseco Fieldhouse  8,253 || 0–1  
|- align="center" bgcolor="bbffbb"
| 2 || September 25 || 3:00pm || Indiana || ESPN2 || 94–77 || Castro Marques (30) || LyttlePrice (7) || Harding (7) || Philips Arena  8,052 || 1–1
|- align="center" bgcolor="bbffbb"
| 3 || September 27 || 8:00pm || @ Indiana || ESPN2 || 83–67 || McCoughtry (26) || Lyttle (11) || Harding (6) || Conseco Fieldhouse  9,036 || 2–1
|-

|- align="center" bgcolor="ffbbbb"
| 1 || October 2 || 8:30pm || @ Minnesota || ESPN || 74–88 || McCoughtry (33) || Bales (9) || Harding (5) || Target Center  15,258 || 0–1
|- align="center" bgcolor="ffbbbb"
| 2 || October 5 || 8:00pm || @ Minnesota || ESPN2 || 95–101  || McCoughtry (38) || de Souza (10) || Harding (7) || Target Center  15,124 || 0–2
|- align="center" bgcolor="ffbbbb"
| 3 || October 7 || 8:00pm || Minnesota || ESPN2 || 67–73 || McCoughtry (22) || de Souza (15) || Harding (7) || Philips Arena  11,543 || 0–3
|-

Standings

Playoffs

Statistics

Regular Season

Playoffs

Awards and Honors

References

External links

Atlanta Dream seasons
Atlanta
Eastern Conference (WNBA) championship seasons
Atlanta Dream